Hammersmith is a London Underground station in Hammersmith. It is on the District line between Barons Court and Ravenscourt Park, and on the Piccadilly line between Barons Court and Acton Town or Turnham Green at very early morning and late evening hours. The station is in Travelcard Zone 2.

The Hammersmith & City line's and Circle line's station of the same name is a separate station to the north-west. The two stations are separated by Hammersmith Broadway.

The lifts at this station, which were replaced towards the end of 2013, provide step-free access between the platforms and the main entrance on Hammersmith Broadway.

History
The station was opened on 9 September 1874 by the District Railway (DR, now the District line) as the western terminus of the railway when it was extended from Earl's Court. In 1877, Hammersmith became a through station when the DR was extended west to meet the London and South Western Railway (L&SWR) at Ravenscourt Park and services over the L&SWR tracks started to Richmond.

On 5 May 1878, the Midland Railway began running a circuitous service known as the Super Outer Circle from St Pancras to Earl's Court via Cricklewood and South Acton on the Dudding Hill Line. It operated over a now disused connection between the North London Railway and the L&SWR Richmond branch. The service was not a success and was ended on 30 September 1880.

On 15 December 1906, the Great Northern, Piccadilly and Brompton Railway (GNP&BR, now the Piccadilly line) opened with Hammersmith as its western terminus.

The opening of the western extension of the Piccadilly line from 4 July 1932 required the reconstruction of the station at track level to increase the number of platforms to four and much of the station was rebuilt behind the Harry W Ford designed station building on Hammersmith Broadway. Charles Holden designed a secondary entrance for Queen Caroline Street virtually identical to one he designed at the same time for Highgate (now Archway) station, since demolished.

In the early 1990s, the station buildings were demolished along with the neighbouring bus garage and incorporated into a modern shopping centre and Underground and bus interchange. During the redevelopment the designers commissioned to undertake the station's re-design, Minale Tattersfield, salvaged parts of the tiling from the Harry W Ford façade showing the station name and the lines serving it and preserved them. They now form a frame to a decorative mosaic of Hammersmith Bridge in the station's north ticket hall.

The station is situated in a cutting below Hammersmith Bus station, covered by a glass roof.

2003 derailment
On 17 October 2003 a Piccadilly Line train derailed in a tunnel just outside the station, when the wheels of the second-to-last carriage left the tracks. There were no injuries, but there was some damage to rails and sleepers. A report from the subsequent investigation, with input from maintenance contractors Metronet, London Underground, rail unions and rail consultants, determined that the direct cause was a broken rail, and suggested that this resulted from outdated specifications for track inspection, resourcing and equipment.

The rail that snapped was on the outside of a curved section of track. It had been turned around by London Underground in 2001, because of corrosion on its inner face, so that what had been its running side was positioned on the outside of the curve. This meant that what had been the running side – the corroded section – was then put under tension.

The combination of corrosion and the forces exerted on it by trains led to the rail snapping. Ultrasonic inspection equipment specified for track inspections was unable to detect outside face cracks of the type thought to have led to the break. Metronet indicated that it would respond to the incident by using different ultrasound detection equipment, increasing the frequency of track inspections, and preferentially replacing rails rather than turning them around.

Connections
London Buses routes 9, 23, 27, 72, 110, 190, 211, 218, 220, 267, 283, 295, 306, 533, H91 and night routes N9, N11, N27, N33, N72, N97 and N266 serve the station from Hammersmith bus station, part of which is above Hammersmith Broadway.

See also
Hammersmith tube station (Circle and Hammersmith & City lines)
Hammersmith (Grove Road) station, a third station that used to exist adjacent to the Hammersmith and City Line station on the L&SWR line through Shepherd's Bush to the West London Line.

References

External links

District line stations
Piccadilly line stations
London Underground Night Tube stations
Tube stations in the London Borough of Hammersmith and Fulham
Former Great Northern, Piccadilly and Brompton Railway stations
Former Metropolitan District Railway stations
Railway stations in Great Britain opened in 1874
Tube station

it:Hammersmith (metropolitana di Londra)#Hammersmith (Piccadilly e District Line)